Vețel is a commune in Hunedoara County, Transylvania, Romania. It is composed of ten villages: Boia Bârzii (Bojabirz), Bretelin (Brettyelin), Căoi (Káun), Herepeia (Filimon Sîrbu between 1948 and 1964; Herepe), Leșnic (Lesnyek), Mintia (Marosnémeti; Bayersdorf), Muncelu Mare (Nagymuncsel), Muncelu Mic (Kismuncsel), Runcu Mic (Erdőhátrunk) and Vețel.

At the 2002 census, 91.6% of the population were Romanians, 4.7% Hungarians and 3.6% Roma. 87.8% were Romanian Orthodox, 4.4% Pentecostal, 3.1% Roman Catholic, 2.1% Baptist and 1.7% Reformed.

Mintia village is the site of the Mintia-Deva Power Station.

Natives
 Filimon Sârbu

References

Communes in Hunedoara County
Localities in Transylvania